Isidora Jeanette Hernández Merino (born 22 August, 1996) is a forward for Deportivo Cali and the Chile women's national team.

Club career
After spent four seasons with Santiago Morning, she moved to Colombia and joined Deportivo Cali in 2023, coinciding with his compatriot Gisela Pino.

International career 
Hernández debuted for Chile on 28 Nov, 2021 in a match against India. She scored her first international goal in the same match.

References

External links
 

1996 births
Living people
Footballers from Santiago
Chilean women's footballers
Chilean expatriate women's footballers
Chile women's international footballers
Club Deportivo Universidad Católica footballers
Universidad de Chile footballers
Santiago Morning (women) footballers
Deportivo Cali (women) players
Chilean expatriate sportspeople in the United States
Chilean expatriate sportspeople in Colombia
Expatriate women's soccer players in the United States
Expatriate women's footballers in Colombia
Women's association football forwards